Museo civico aufidenate Antonio De Nino (Italian for Antonio De Nino Aufidena Civic Museum)  is an archaeology museum in Alfedena, Abruzzo.

History

Collection

Notes

External links

Alfedena
Museums in Abruzzo
Archaeological museums in Italy